The Cogswell Interchange is a multi-level highway interchange in downtown Halifax, Nova Scotia, Canada. It was built as the first stage of a greater scheme for an elevated freeway, called Harbour Drive, which would have run south through downtown and necessitated demolition of much of the downtown building stock. The plan was halted in the face of significant public opposition, but the Cogswell Interchange remains a visible reminder, occupying a large amount of prime land and posing a barrier to pedestrian movement.

As the interchange is functionally obsolete and increasingly expensive to maintain, the municipal government has decided to demolish the interchange and replace it with a more conventional street grid. Halifax Regional Council unanimously approved the 90 per cent design construction plan in February 2019 and directed staff to tender demolition and construction contracts for the redevelopment. Work began on the project in March 2022 and the newly renamed Cogswell District is scheduled to be open to the public by late 2025.

Origins
The city began purchasing land and demolishing buildings in the 1950s in anticipation of the highway construction. In the 1960s, urban renewal planning was underway all over North America and Europe, and Halifax was no exception. In 1962, the city placed advertisements in newspapers seeking development proposals for the Central Redevelopment Area, an area of several city blocks worth of older wood-framed buildings. This eventually became Scotia Square, a complex of office, residential and hotel towers atop parking garages and a shopping mall. 

The developers of Scotia Square, a project of a scale hitherto unattempted in the Maritimes, stressed the importance of improved transport infrastructure to the complex and commissioned a study recommending a conceptual precursor to "Harbour Drive", a proposed elevated freeway running parallel to the water, similar to the Gardiner Expressway in downtown Toronto.

A.D. Margison & Associates, successor to the firm which designed the Gardiner Expressway decades earlier, was hired by the city in 1967 to formally design the new highway and interchange. Opposition to the plan began to mount, led by the Nova Scotia Association of Architects with Allan F. Duffus at the helm. Many architects, engineers and planners spoke out against the destruction of the historic urban core and stated that it was not too late to build "simpler roads," which would require less demolition. Duffus produced an alternate plan, which A.D. Margison & Associates said would "overload the streets with traffic by 1970" and was rejected by city council, which feared that any changes to the interchange plan would jeopardise tenancy agreements made with respect to Scotia Square.

After demolition of the remaining buildings on the site, construction of the interchange began in 1969. It opened in 1970, the same year the municipal government recanted and cancelled construction of the remainder of Harbour Drive. It then cost $5.8 million.

Demolition and redevelopment
In the decades since construction, the interchange became a much-maligned feature of downtown Halifax. It was considered excessively large and pedestrian unfriendly. It separates downtown from the North End and the waterfront from the uphill areas.

Over the years there were several proposals for its demolition. The most current, the Cogswell Interchange Lands Plan, is being implemented.

The plan aims to offer quality urban design and promote economic development through a number of goals:

 reinstating a walkable, at-grade road system
 forming a new north gateway to downtown
 improving active transportation linkages
 reconnecting downtown to the North End
 increasing density to form a mixed-use neighbourhood downtown for living, working, and playing
 strengthen Barrington Street's position as the primary north–south street downtown (it is currently severed by the Cogswell Interchange)
 maintain visual connections to the harbour
 form viable lots for private development and economic growth
 provide a new transit hub

On September 20, 2016, the municipal government voted to hire a company to develop a plan for the interchange's removal and replacement by a more appropriate road network with the design work being carried out by WSP Group and several design consultants. 

In February 2019, council approved the 90 per cent design plan and directed city staff to proceed with a tender for the demolition and redevelopment of the site. 

As of September 2021, the tender to construct the new district was awarded. Demolition and subsequent construction began in 2022, and the project is expected to be complete in 2025.

A ceremony marking the commencement of the redevelopment project, hosted by Mayor Mike Savage, was held on 2 November 2021.

Responsibility
The municipality and the province share responsibility for maintenance of the bridge spans. The municipality is responsible for the road surfaces and the retaining walls.

See also
 Highway revolts
 Traffic in Towns

References

External links

 Cogswell District
Cogswell District Redevelopment Plan - Halifax Shape Your City Public Engagement Forum

Cancelled highway projects in Canada
Road interchanges in Canada
Roads in Halifax, Nova Scotia